The Grand Army of the Republic (GAR) was a fraternal organization composed of veterans of the Union Army, U.S. Navy, U.S. Marines and U.S. Revenue Cutter Service who served in the American Civil War. Founded on April 6, 1866 in Springfield, Illinois on the principles of "Fraternity, Charity and Loyalty" by Benjamin F. Stephenson, it was dissolved in 1956 when its last member died.

Linking men through their experience of the war, the GAR became among the first organized advocacy group in American politics, supporting voting rights for black veterans, lobbying the US Congress to establish veterans' pensions, and supporting Republican political candidates. Its peak membership, at more than 400,000, was in 1890.  It was succeeded by the Sons of Union Veterans of the Civil War (SUVCW), composed of male descendants of Union veterans.

The GAR initially grew and prospered as a de facto political arm of the Republican Party during the heated political contests of the Reconstruction era. The commemoration of Union veterans, black and white, immediately became entwined with partisan politics. When the Republican Party's commitment to reform in the South gradually decreased, the GAR's mission became ill-defined and the organization floundered. The GAR almost disappeared in the early 1870s, and many divisions ceased to exist.

In the 1880s, the organization revived under new leadership that provided a platform for renewed growth, by advocating federal pensions for veterans. As the organization revived, black veterans joined in significant numbers and organized local posts. The national organization, however, failed to press the case for pensions for black soldiers. Most black troops never received any pension or remuneration for wounds incurred during their service.

The GAR was organized into "Departments" at the state level and "Posts" at the community level, and military-style uniforms were worn by its members. There were posts in every state in the U.S., and several posts overseas.

Commanders-in-Chief were elected by the membership at the National Encampments for one year terms.  Several Commanders-in-Chief were re-elected for additional terms.

Grand Army of the Republic Commanders-in Chief

Footnotes